Plocoscyphia is an extinct genus of sea sponges belonging to the family Callodictyonidae.

Fossil records
This genus is known in the fossil record from the Permian period to the Eocene (age range from 254.0 to 37.2 million years ago). Fossils of species within this genus have been found in Europe and China.

Species
 Plocoscyphia centuncula Schrammen 1912
 Plocoscyphia communis Moret 1925
 Plocoscyphia elegans Smith 1848
 Plocoscyphia fenestrata Smith and Toulmin 1848
 Plocoscyphia gaultina Moret 1925
 Plocoscyphia labrosa T. Smith
 Plocoscyphia maaki Schrammen 1912
 Plocoscyphia roemeri Leonhard 1897

References

See also List of prehistoric sponge genera

Prehistoric sponge genera
Hexactinellida genera